These are the Official Charts Company's UK Dance Chart number-one singles of 2013. The dates listed in the menus below represent the Saturday after the Sunday the chart was announced, as per the way the dates are given in chart publications such as the ones produced by Billboard, Guinness, and Virgin.

Chart history

 – the single was simultaneously number-one on the singles chart.

Number-one artists

See also

List of UK Singles Chart number ones of the 2010s
List of UK Dance Albums Chart number ones of 2013
List of UK Singles Downloads Chart number ones of the 2000s
List of UK Independent Singles Chart number ones of 2013
List of UK R&B Singles Chart number ones of 2013
List of UK Rock & Metal Singles Chart number ones of 2013

References

External links
Dance Singles Top 40 at the Official Charts Company
UK Top 40 Dance Singles at BBC Radio 1

2013 in British music
United Kingdom Dance Singles
2013